Sidneyia is an extinct arthropod known from fossils found from the Early to the Mid Cambrian of China and the Burgess Shale formation of British Columbia. 144 specimens of Sidneyia are known from the Greater Phyllopod bed, where they comprise 0.27% of the community.

General description 

It is thought to have been a benthic carnivore and scavenger that walked along the sea floor in search of hard-shelled prey. Gut contents have revealed that Sidneyia fed largely on small trilobites, as well as on brachiopods, hyoliths and small arthropods. The gut was narrow, but widens posteriorly to form a pocket where digestion presumably took place. The retention of feces likely indicates infrequent feeding Its exquisitely preserved gnathobases resemble those of Limulus, and were probably used to crush prey.

Sidneyia was discovered in 1910 during the first day of Charles Walcott's exploration of the Burgess Shale. He named it after his elder son, Sidney, who had helped to locate the site and collect the specimen. The species name, Sidneyia inexpectans, is derived from the meaning of "Sidney's surprise".

About 200 specimens have been documented.

Sidneyia sinica was named in 2002 from a specimen found in the Maotianshan Shales. However, it has since been rejected from the genus, and other indeterminate specimens assigned to the genus from the Spence Shale and Sirius Passet lack key diagnostic characters. Specimens that can confidently assigned to the genus include Sidneyia cf. inexpectans, known from the Wuliuan Mantou Formation of North China., as well as Sidneyia minor from the Early Cambrian (Cambrian Stage 3) Xiaoshiba Biota of Yunnan, China.

Taxonomy 
Sidneyia has been placed as part of the Artiopoda, a group of extinct arthropods containing trilobites and their relatives, more specifically as a basal member of Vicissicaudata.

References

External links

Further reading

Prehistoric arthropod genera
Burgess Shale fossils
Maotianshan shales fossils
Wheeler Shale
Artiopoda
Cambrian genus extinctions